Amager ( or, especially among older speakers) in the Øresund is Denmark's most densely populated island, with more than 216,000 inhabitants (January 2022) a small appendage to Zealand. The protected natural area of Naturpark Amager (including Kalvebod Fælled) makes up more than one-third of the island's total area of 96 km2.

The Danish capital, Copenhagen Municipality, is partly situated on Amager, covering the northern part of the island, which is connected to the much larger island of Zealand by eight bridges and a metro tunnel. Amager also has a connection across the Øresund to Sweden, the Øresund Bridge. Its western part begins with a tunnel from Amager to another Danish island, Peberholm.

Amager is the largest island in the Øresund, and the only one with a large population. , 212,661 people lived on the island, including its northern tip, Christianshavn. The northern part is included in the Copenhagen municipality. The middle part comprises Tårnby municipality, which encompasses the airport in Kastrup and islands of Saltholm and Peberholm, and Dragør municipality is located on the southeast part of the island.

Most of the western part is land that was claimed from the sea from the 1930s-1950s. This enlargement, from the shallow sound towards Zealand, is known as Kalveboderne. The enlargement has never been built-up and its soil is unsuitable for agricultural use. However, the area between Dragør town and the airport is cultivated land of high quality. Amager has in the past been referred to as the "kitchen of Copenhagen". At the border of the enlargement there is an old beech forest, Kongelunden (The King's Grove).

History

Amager has long been populated, and well used, thanks to its rich soil and proximity to Copenhagen. In 1521, Christian II invited some Dutch farmers to move to Amager and grow vegetables to supply the Danish Court and Copenhagen. These farmers enjoyed certain privileges such as their own government and institutions, such as their own schools and priests. Due to this and a ban on mixed marriages, they maintained their own language, Amager Dutch, which remained spoken until 1858. This dialect's spelling and vocabulary was influenced by Danish, and it had heavier phonological and grammatical influence from Low German, due to the importance of Low German in trade in the Baltic Sea and the influence of Low German-speaking Lutheran clergy.

It was only in the late 19th century that Copenhagen began to expand onto the island (Sundbyerne), and in 1902 these built-up areas were incorporated into Copenhagen.

During the Second World War, high unemployment in Copenhagen led authorities to drain a large part of the sea, west of the island, and build a dam to hold out the water, effectively adding one half of Amager's previous area to the island.

The claimed area is currently known as Kalvebod Fælled, and was originally a military area, but today it is part of a major construction area called the Ørestad, being thought of as an extension to central Copenhagen. The area houses major facilities such as:
 Bella Center, a convention and exposition center
 Field's, the second-largest shopping center in Scandinavia
 Royal Arena, a multi-use indoor arena
This project was initiated by the Danish government.

The beach area to the east of the island, known as Amager Strandpark (Amager Beach Park), which had fallen into disrepair since its inception in the 1930s, was extensively redeveloped between May 2004 and August 2005. A 2-km-long artificial island was constructed just off the mainland, from which it is separated by a small lagoon.

Until the 1970s, Amager was used as a place to dump latrine waste; this led to a slang term for the island 'Lorteøen' (Shit Island). See Renholdningsselskabet af 1898.

Amenities

Large parts of Kalvebod Fælled are rich in nature and have many grazing cows and horses. This area allows the citizens of Copenhagen to experience nature, without travelling far from the city.

Amager is also home to the Amager Bio, a cinema, concert and cultural venue. Top bands from the last 40 years have played there, both those of international origin (Prince, Alien Ant Farm, P.O.D, Aimee Mann, Uriah Heep, King Crimson, Cradle of Filth, John Mayall and the Bluesbreakers, Jethro Tull, The Moody Blues, MGMT, Nas, Andrew Bird) and from Denmark (D.A.D, Dodo and the Dodos, Johnny Deluxe, Big Fat Snake).

Amager Common (Danish: Amager Fælled) is a 223 hectare nature reserve in north-west Amager. The former military area is home to a diverse range of flora and fauna; including forests, fields, and Highland cattle.

The King's Grove (Danish: Kongelunden) is a large oak forest located on the southern side of Amager. It's popular for cycling, bird watching, and horseback riding.

The National Aquarium Denmark is situated in the east of Amager and is Northern Europe's largest aquarium.

Communities 

Various communities are located on Amager, including Islands Brygge, and the towns of Dragør, Kastrup, and Tårnby.

Transport

Amager is connected by tunnel to the artificial island Peberholm from which Øresund Bridge connects Denmark to Sweden. The construction of the bridge has had a significant impact on the physical geography of the island, largely due to the construction of new highways.

The Copenhagen Metro connects Amager to central Copenhagen. The metro line from Vanløse to Amager divides into M1 and M2 lines at Christianshavn and then continue to Vestamager and Lufthavnen (Copenhagen Airport).

Copenhagen Airport is in the eastern part of Amager. It is linked by train, metro and bus services.

Expressions with 'Amager' 
 Amar! – an incantation for innocence, a mild oath (honest Injun! cross my heart!)
 Amagergarn – mercerised cotton embroidery thread, pearl yarn, perle cotton, coton perlé (in German: :de:Perlgarn)
 Amagerbroderi (Amager embroidery) is colourful flat sewing known from Amager
 Amagersyning (Amager stitching) is Dutch-inspired embroidery techniques
 Amagerhylde – Amager shelf, an A-shaped triangular shelf for trinkets
 Amagermad – Amager sandwich, consisting of one slice of brown and one of white bread with butter between them, and evt. cold cuts
 Amager-nummerplade (vehicle registration plate of Amager) is a lower-back tattoo.

Notable people

 Christiane Koren (1764–1815) a Danish-Norwegian writer
 Klaus Rifbjerg (1931–2015) a Danish writer
 Ole Rasmussen (born 1952) a Danish former football player
 Frank Arnesen (born 1956) a former Danish footballer
 Morten Stig Christensen (born 1958) a former Danish handball player
 Brian Holm (born 1962) a retired Danish professional rider in road bicycle racing
 Peter Frödin (born 1964) a Danish actor, comedian and singer 
 Linse Kessler (born 1966) a Danish television personality, actress and businesswoman
 Jacob Moe Rasmussen (born 1975) a Danish former cyclist
 Mikkel Kessler (born 1979) a Danish former professional boxer
 Christine Milton (born 1985) a Danish pop singer, songwriter and professional dancer
 Martin Bernburg (born 1985) a Danish professional footballer
 Joey Moe (born 1985) a Danish-Hawaiian hip hop pop singer and producer
 Nicklas Bendtner (born 1988) a Danish professional footballer
 Christopher (born 1992) also known as Christopher Nissen, is a Danish singer
 Cisilia (born 1998)  also known as Cisilia Ismailova, is a Danish singer

See also 
 List of islands of Denmark

References

External links

 Amager Beach Park
 Amager Bio
Paintings from Amager

 
Geography of Copenhagen
Islands of Denmark